Hédi Jouini (1 November 1909 – 30 November 1990) was a Tunisian singer, oud player, and composer. In his long career, Jouini composed close to 1,070 songs and 56 operettas.  His songs are inspired by traditional Andalusian music, and found great popularity in Tunisia and the countries of the Mashriq.

Life

Early life
He was born Mohamed Hédi Ben Abdessalem Ben Ahmed Ben Hassine in the Bab Jedid quarter of Tunis. In his youth, he sang religious hymns for local ceremonies, including those for circumcision. He abandoned academic pursuits for music and song. He particularly liked the works of singer Mohammed Abdel Wahab.

Debut
After a brief sojourn at The Rachidia, from the age of sixteen Jouini began to appear in local bands as a mandolin player. He was introduced to the oud by Mouni Jebali, father of Maurice Meimoun. At 20 years of age, his popularity increased upon singing with the Arruqi troupe at the Bab Souika.

He worked with Mahmoud Bayram al-Tunisi.

Later life
He played a live concert for the inauguration of Radio Tunis in 1938.

In the 1940s, he appeared in the film Le Possédé by Jean Bastia. He composed songs for the 1948 film La Septième Porte by André Zwobada, in which he appeared along with his wife Widad.

In 1966, he was elevated to the rank of officer of the Order of the Republic of Tunisia by president Habib Bourguiba. He received a new decoration from President Bourguiba in 1982 for his work and contribution to the enrichment of the Tunisian cultural patrimony.

In 1986, he produced his last composisition Masbarnech. A year later, in 1987, Jouini made his last public appearance on stage at the International Festival of Carthage.

Influence

A film documenting the life of Hedi Jouini, The Man behind the Microphone, was released in 2017.

References

Further reading
Naoufel Belhassine, Hédi Jouini. La trace d'un géant, ed. Bénévent, Paris, 2009 

1909 births
1990 deaths
People from Tunis
Tunisian composers
20th-century Tunisian male singers
20th-century composers
Tunisian oud players